The 1988–89 ECHL season was the inaugural season of the East Coast Hockey League.  The leagues first season consisted of five teams in Erie, Pennsylvania, Johnstown, Pennsylvania, Knoxville, Tennessee, Vinton, Virginia and Winston-Salem, North Carolina.  The 5 teams played 60 games each in the schedule.  The Erie Panthers finished first overall in the regular season.  The Carolina Thunderbirds won the first Riley Cup championship.

Regular season
Note: GP = Games played; W = Wins; L= Losses; OTL = Overtime losses; GF = Goals for; GA = Goals against; Pts = Points; Green shade = Clinched playoff spot

Riley Cup playoffs

1989 Riley Cup Finals

Johnstown Chiefs vs. Carolina Thunderbirds

ECHL awards

References
All stats from Internet Hockey Database

See also
 ECHL
 ECHL All-Star Game
 Kelly Cup
 List of ECHL seasons

ECHL seasons
3